is a Japanese football player for SC Sagamihara.

Career
Tsujio was a member of F.C. Tokyo's youth program, and after graduating from Chuo University he joined S-Pulse in 2008.

Club statistics
Updated to 23 February 2019.

References

External links

Profile at Zweigen Kanazawa

1985 births
Living people
Chuo University alumni
Association football people from Osaka Prefecture
People from Sakai, Osaka
Japanese footballers
J1 League players
J2 League players
J3 League players
Shimizu S-Pulse players
Sanfrecce Hiroshima players
Oita Trinita players
Zweigen Kanazawa players
SC Sagamihara players
Footballers at the 2006 Asian Games
Association football defenders
Asian Games competitors for Japan